Yarskoye is a rural locality (a selo) and the administrative center of Yarskoye Rural Settlement, Novooskolsky District, Belgorod Oblast, Russia. The population was 745 as of 2010. There are 4 streets.

Geography 
Yarskoye is located 30 km southwest of Novy Oskol (the district's administrative centre) by road. Bogdanovka is the nearest rural locality.

References 

Rural localities in Novooskolsky District

Renamed localities of Belgorod Oblast